Muhlenberg may refer to:

People 
 Muhlenberg (surname)
 The Muhlenberg family, American political, religious, and military dynasty

Places 
 Muhlenberg County, Kentucky
 Muhlenberg College, in Allentown, Pennsylvania
 Muhlenberg School District, in Berks County, Pennsylvania
 Muhlenberg Township, Pennsylvania, in Berks County
 Lake Muhlenberg, in Allentown, Pennsylvania

See also 
 Mühleberg, a municipality in Bern canton, Switzerland
 Muhlenberg legend